Thymistadopsis is a genus of moths belonging to the subfamily Drepaninae.

Species
 Thymistadopsis albidescens (Hampson, 1895)
 Thymistadopsis trilinearia (Moore, 1867)
 Thymistadopsis undulifera (Hampson, 1900)

References

Drepaninae
Drepanidae genera